The 2011 OFC Champions League Final was played over two legs between the winner of Group A Amicale from Vanuatu and the winner of Group B Auckland City from New Zealand in the 2010–11 OFC Champions League.

Auckland City won the final 6–1 on aggregate. As OFC Champions League winners they qualified for the 2011 FIFA Club World Cup as the OFC representative, entering the qualifying play-off round.

Road to final

Rules
The winners of groups A and B played in the final over two legs. The hosts of each leg was decided by draw, and announced by the OFC on 22 March 2011. The away goals rule would be applied, and extra time and penalty shootout would be used to decide the winner if necessary.

Match summary

|}

First leg

Second leg

Champion

References

External links
OFC Champions League

OFC Champions League finals